Munchirai Punitha Arockiamatha Matric Higher Secondary School (MPAMS) is a private co-educational LKG-12 day school in Puthukkadai built by Munchirai Punitha Arockiamatha Educational Trust, named after the church. This school was established in 1997 and has been a matric school since 2003. Rajendra Babu became principal in 2008. The school prepares students for the SSLC and HSLC examinations. Admissions to the school are moderately competitive. This school is recognized for its high quality standards and discipline.

Facilities

Education 
The school has a computer lab, physics lab, chemistry lab and biology lab and provides educomp smart classes for all classes. The school conducts science exhibitions, sports days, excellence days and sales days annually.

Sports 
Individual and team games are encouraged by the school authorities.

Other activities 
This school provides special coaching for students in martial arts and in folk dances.

Christian schools in Tamil Nadu
Primary schools in Tamil Nadu
High schools and secondary schools in Tamil Nadu
Schools in Kanyakumari district
Educational institutions established in 1997
1997 establishments in Tamil Nadu